The Manapa-Tarhunta letter (CTH 191; KUB 19.5 + KBo 19.79) is a tablet in Luwian/Hittite language from the thirteenth century BC, which has come down to us in a fairly good state of conservation. It was discovered in the 1980s. 

It was written by a client king called Manapa-Tarhunta, ruler of the Arzawa kingdom called the Seha River Land, between about 1322 and 1280 BC to an unnamed Hittite king who was his overlord. There is general agreement among scholars in identifying the recipient of the letter as King Muwatalli II, on the Hittite throne from 1295 to 1272 BC.

Author 
The only datable Manapa-Tarhunta was the one who became undisputed king of Seha River around the time of the death of Arnuwanda II (1322 BCE).

This letter further mentions a Kupanta-Kurunta of the Kingdom of Mira who was born around 1330 BC, and was a faithful Hittite ally. A treaty between Mursili II (1322-1295 BCE) and Kupanta-Kurunta survives which mentions this Manapa-Tarhunta as still alive.

Manapa-Tarhunta had passed on the succession to Manapa-Kurunta (presumably Tarhunta's son) by the time of the treaty between Muwatalli II (1295-1272 BCE) and Alaksandu of Wilusa. The Manapa-Tarhunta letter would then have been written in the later years of Mursili or else the earlier years of Muwatalli II.

Contents 
The Manapa-Tarhunta letter mentions first an attack on Wilusa, and then how a notorious local troublemaker called Piyama-Radu is harrying the western lands. The Hittite king has apparently ordered Manapa-Tarhunta to drive out Piyama-Radu himself, but Manapa-Tarhunta's attempt has failed, so that a Hittite force is now sent out to deal with the problem. Before marching to Wilusa, the expeditionary force camps at the land near the Seha River, placing Wilusa in the north-west corner of Anatolia.

The letter also mentions Atpa, King of Miletus according to the Tawagalawa letter, and an attack on Hatti's historic ally Wilusa. These figures and events associate the Manapa-Tarhunta letter with an early stage of the events mentioned in the Tawagalawa letter (c. 1250 BCE).

That letter mentions the brother of Ahhiyawa's king, and some suggest this figure to be the legendary Eteocles, who lived a generation before the Trojan War. No king of Ahhiyawa is on record before Mursili III's reign; at most there might have been a "man from Ahhiya" as under Arnuwanda I (1400-1360 BCE).

Piyama-Radu is further mentioned, as a past figure, in the Milawata letter (c. 1225 BCE); which like the other two letters handles the aftermath of events in Wilusa which did not go the Hittites' way.

For Trevor Bryce, this led to the conclusion that the location of Wilusa is related or identical to that of the archeological site of Troy (Illios).

Interpretation 
These events have sometimes been interpreted as a historical basis for the Trojan War, particularly in popular literature. Although this interpretation remains a viable hypothesis, it is not favored by current scholarship.

For instance, a section divider in the Manapa-Tarhunta letter seems to suggest that Piyama-Radu's activities were not related to Wilusa. Some scholars observe that the letter is divided into two parts; the first part narrates the attack on Wilusa by the Hittite general Kassu, and also speaks of Manhapa-Tarhunta's illness, while the second part tells of the humiliations suffered by the same Manhapa-Tarunta at the hands of Piyama-Radu. Here the letter also speaks of Atpa, the son-in-law of Piyama-Radu, and also of the request for restitution of prisoners made by the king of Mira Kupanta-Kurunta.

These prisoners are described in the letter as 'sariputu people'; they were some specialized craftsmen, possibly purple dyers. They were captured by Piyamaradu in Lazpa (Lesbos), and then appealed to Atpa to be set free. Then a man named Kassu arrived, and somehow helped to resolve the conflict.

It is therefore considered possible that these could be unrelated episodes, and that Wilusa's occupation does not need to be attributed to Piyama-Radu.

Similarly, although the Tawagalawa letter alludes to a previous disagreement between the Hittites and Ahhiyawa concerning Wilusa, it gives no indication that tensions escalated beyond strongly worded cuneiform tablets.

Trevor Bryce cautions that our current understanding of Wilusa's history is not sufficient to conclude that there was an actual Trojan War. According to him, "the less material one has, the more easily it can be manipulated to fit whatever conclusion one wishes to come up with".

See also

Tawagalawa letter
Milawata letter
Historicity of the Homeric epics

References

Literature
 Eric H. Cline, Gary M. Beckman, Trevor Bryce, eds (2012), The Ahhiyawa Texts. Brill  (9004219714)
Forrer, Forsch. I/1 ('26) 90ff., AU ('32) 170 n.1
Houwink ten Cate, JEOL 28 (1985) 33-79;
Steph. JAOS 84:27 n. 35

External links
Translation of the Manapa-Tarhunta Letter

13th-century BC literature
1980s archaeological discoveries
Hittite texts
Wilusa
Assuwa league
Archaeological sources on Greek mythology
Priam